Celia Bourihane (born January 22, 1995 in Béjaïa) is an Algerian volleyball player. She participated in the 2012 London Olympics playing on the Algerian volleyball team.

Clubs

 Debut and Current club:  Mca Alger

References

1995 births
Living people
Algerian women's volleyball players
Volleyball players from Béjaïa
Olympic volleyball players of Algeria
Volleyball players at the 2012 Summer Olympics
Liberos
21st-century Algerian people